Devil's Tower is a 2014 horror film and the feature film directorial debut of Owen Tooth. The movie was first released in the United Kingdom on 16 September 2014 and stars Jason Mewes and Roxanne Pallett as two people that find themselves forced to fight against zombies.

Of the film, Pallett stated that she found her role to be very demanding, as it required her to work eighteen-hour days over a period of two months.

Synopsis 
Sarah (Roxanne Pallett) is a young woman that has been thrown out of her house by her alcoholic mother and forced to live in Albion Court, a run-down apartment building with a seedy reputation. With no other options, Sarah tries to make the best of a bad situation and initially things seem to be going fairly well, as she finds that she gets along well with her neighbors. However it isn't long before a series of strange events culminates in a horde of zombies appearing and attacking the building's occupants.

Cast 
 Jason Mewes as Sid
 Roxanne Pallett as Sarah MacColl
 Frances Ruffelle as Kim MacColl 
 Jessica-Jane Clement as Kate
 Jessica Ann Bonner as Beverly
 Eddie Webber as Carnacki
 Emma Buckley as Lucy
 Jason Bee as Zombie
 Amelia Linney as Mary Butler
 Jazzy Lyntott as Paul
 Peter Barrett as Mark
 Jill Myers as Susan
 Larry Waller as Michael
 Adam Dakin as Jon
 Alison Carroll as Fiona
 Rob Law as Wyngarde
 Jessica Ann Bonner as Bev
 Nathan Morris as Esteban
 Ed Kear as Saxon
 Ahmed Hashimi as Kev
 Holly Henderson & Amanda Leavesley as Party Girls

Reception 
Critical reception for Devil's Tower has been moderately positive, with multiple reviewers commenting that although the film was overly familiar and lacked originality, the movie's acting was decent and the film's script was entertaining. Dread Central gave the film three blades, praising the performance of Jessica-Jane Clement and writing: "It's a strong enough story given some real effort by the cast and was obviously put together by filmmakers with a love of the genre and the drive to make it work regardless of limitations." FromPage2Screen.Com rated the film very highly again noticing the care and attention given to the film, by filmmakers who love their craft

References

External links 
 

2014 films
2014 horror films
British zombie films
British ghost films
British haunted house films
2010s English-language films
2010s British films